L. Presnyakova was a Soviet film producer who produced two films between 1958 and 1962.

Filmography
 Road to the Stars (1958)
 Planeta Bur (1962)

External links

Soviet film producers
Year of birth missing
Year of death missing